Puckett's Versus the Country Boy is the debut solo EP from former Weezer bassist and The Rentals front man Matt Sharp. The album features no electric guitar, synths, or percussion. Instead lap steel, acoustic guitar, piano, and organ are the only accompaniment to Sharp's vocals. The album was recorded in Tennessee.

Track listing

External links
 

2003 EPs
Matt Sharp albums